Oumé is a town in south-central Ivory Coast. It is a sub-prefecture of and the seat of Oumé Department in Gôh Region, Gôh-Djiboua District. Oumé is also a commune.

Notable people 
 Bonaventure Kalou (born 12 January 1978), International footballer
 Salomon Kalou (born 5 August 1985), International footballer

References

Sub-prefectures of Gôh
Communes of Gôh